Whale is a hamlet in the Eden district, in the county of Cumbria, England. Historically in Westmorland,  it is about a mile south of the village of Askham. In the Imperial Gazetteer of England and Wales of 1870-72 it had a population of 53.

Location grid

See also

Listed buildings in Lowther, Cumbria

References 

Hamlets in Cumbria
Eden District